Saglaarjuk (Inuktitut syllabicsᓴᒡᓛᕐᔪᒃ) formerly Amherst Island is one of several uninhabited, irregularly shaped islands located on the south side of the Fury and Hecla Strait of Nunavut's Qikiqtaaluk Region within the northern Canadian Arctic. It is west of Liddon Island, north of Grinnell Lake on the mainland's Melville Peninsula, and south of Baffin Island.

The island was, at one time, named for Jeffery Amherst, 1st Baron Amherst, a British Army officer who was command forces that captured Louisburg, Quebec and Montreal from the French and later became Governors General of Province of Quebec.

As part of the Arctic Archipelago, it was held by the British as part of the British Arctic Territories until 1880.

References

External links 
 Amherst Island in the Atlas of Canada - Toporama; Natural Resources Canada

Uninhabited islands of Qikiqtaaluk Region